Ryan Keller (born January 6, 1984) is a Canadian former professional ice hockey player. He played in Switzerland, Finland and various North American minor league teams, and the Ottawa Senators of the National Hockey League.

Playing career
Keller spent four seasons playing junior hockey in the Western Hockey League for the Saskatoon Blades. Since turning pro in 2005, Keller has had spells in the American Hockey League for the Grand Rapids Griffins and the Syracuse Crunch and also in the United Hockey League for the Muskegon Fury. In 2005, Keller played pre-season games for Sparta Warriors in Norway, before leaving to train with the NHL Detroit Red Wings. In 2007, he moved to Finland, signing for Espoo Blues. He played on the team for two seasons, leading the team in scoring in both seasons.

Keller returned to North America in 2009 to sign with the Ottawa Senators. Keller was assigned to the Binghamton Senators to start the 2009–10 season. Keller was recalled to Ottawa on November 24, and he played his first NHL game on November 25, 2009 against the New Jersey Devils. After leading Binghamton with 34 goals Keller was re-signed with a one-year contract by Ottawa on May 19, 2010. Keller was named captain of the Senators who would go on to win the Calder Cup in 2011.

After playing for the Binghamton Senators of the AHL in 2010–11, as a free agent, on July 4, 2011, Keller signed a one-year, two-way contract with the Edmonton Oilers.

He headed to Switzerland in 2012, joining Genève-Servette HC of the National League A (NLA) for the 2012-13 campaign. In 2013, he moved on to fellow NLA side ZSC Lions. He won the 2014 Swiss championship and the 2016 Swiss Cup with the Lions. Keller announced his retirement from professional ice hockey on July 13, 2016.

Career statistics

Regular season and playoffs

International

International

Awards and honours

References

External links

1984 births
Living people
Binghamton Senators players
Canadian ice hockey right wingers
Espoo Blues players
Genève-Servette HC players
Grand Rapids Griffins players
Sportspeople from Saskatoon
Muskegon Fury players
Oklahoma City Barons players
Ottawa Senators players
Ice hockey people from Saskatchewan
Saskatoon Blades players
Syracuse Crunch players
Undrafted National Hockey League players
ZSC Lions players
Canadian expatriate ice hockey players in Finland
Canadian expatriate ice hockey players in Switzerland